William Cunningham (born March 25, 1974) is an American professional basketball player, formerly in the National Basketball Association (NBA).

A 6'11" center from Temple University, Cunningham played in 16 games for four different NBA teams from 1998 to 1999, He has played for the Utah Jazz (1998), Philadelphia 76ers (1998), Toronto Raptors (1999) and New Jersey Nets (1999). He was not drafted by an NBA team but was taken in the 1996 USBL Draft. He has also played professionally in China, Russia, Egypt, Uruguay.

References

External links
NBA.com player profile
NBA stats @ basketballreference.com

1974 births
Living people
American expatriate basketball people in Canada
American expatriate basketball people in Uruguay
American men's basketball players
Atlantic City Seagulls players
Basketball players from Augusta, Georgia
Centers (basketball)
Harlem Globetrotters players
New Jersey Nets players
Philadelphia 76ers players
Temple Owls men's basketball players
Toronto Raptors players
Undrafted National Basketball Association players
Utah Jazz players